Adhora Khan is a Bangladeshi film actress and model.

Career
Adhora made her film debut in Nayok, released on October 19, 2018. Her co-star of the film was Bappy Chowdhury.

A week later, on October 26, 2018, her second film Matal was released, co-starring Symon Sadik.

Filmography

References

External links
 

Living people
Bangladeshi film actresses
Actresses in Bengali cinema
People from Shariatpur District
Bangladeshi actresses
Year of birth missing (living people)